Khailar is a census town in Jhansi district in the Indian state of Uttar Pradesh. There is famous Hanuman temple in Khailar.

Geography
It has an average elevation of 317 metres (1040 feet).Khailar is well known for its history. When India was not divided, Khailar was considered as the center point of India.

Demographics
 India census, Khailar had a population of 12,343. Males constitute 53% of the population and females 47%. Khailar has an average literacy rate of 71%, higher than the national average of 59.5%: male literacy is 78%, and female literacy is 63%. In Khailar, 12% of the population is under 6 years of age.

References

Cities and towns in Jhansi district